The barbarian kingdoms, also known as the post-Roman kingdoms, the western kingdoms or the early medieval kingdoms, were the states founded by various non-Roman, primarily Germanic, peoples in Western Europe and North Africa following the collapse of the Western Roman Empire in the fifth century. The formation of the barbarian kingdoms was a complicated, gradual and largely unintentional process, as the Roman state failed to handle barbarian migrants on the imperial borders, leading to both invasions and invitations into imperial territory, but simultaneously denied barbarians the ability to properly integrate into the imperial framework. The influence of barbarian rulers, at first local warlords and client kings without firm connections to any territories, increased as Roman emperors and usurpers used them as pawns in civil wars. It was only after the collapse of effective Western Roman central authority that the barbarian realms transitioned into proper territorial kingdoms.

The barbarian kings of the west drew on legitimacy through connecting themselves to the Roman Empire in order to strengthen their rule. Virtually all of them assumed the style dominus noster ("our lord"), previously used by the emperors, and many assumed the praenomen Flavius, borne by virtually all Roman emperors in late antiquity. The kings typically also assumed a subordinate position in diplomacy with the remaining Eastern Roman Empire. The barbarian kings also adopted many aspects of the late Roman administration, but the old Roman system gradually dissolved and disappeared over the centuries, accelerated by periods of political turmoil. The major difference between the administration of the old Western Roman Empire and the new royal administrations was their scale, as the barbarian governments, on accounts of controlling significantly less territory, were less deep and less complex. As a result, there was a considerable breakdown in living standards as well as social and economic complexity. For the most part, the barbarian kingdoms were highly fragile and ephemeral. By the time of the coronation of Charlemagne, king of the Franks, as emperor in 800, the event usually seen as marking the end of the age of the barbarian kingdoms, only the Frankish kingdom remained out of the once vast and diverse network of kingdoms.

Formation 

The rise of the barbarian kingdoms in the territory previously governed by the Western Roman Empire was a gradual, complex and largely unintentional process. The starting point of the process that led to their formation were the migrations of large numbers of barbarian (i.e. non-Roman) peoples into the territory of the Roman Empire. The migrations were spurred by both invasions and invitations. Inviting peoples from beyond the imperial frontier to settle Roman territory was not a new policy, but something that had been done several times by emperors in the past, mostly for economic, agricultural or military purposes. The capacity for immigration in a state as large and powerful as the Roman Empire was nearly infinite, but several events and accidents in the fourth through fifth centuries complicated the situation.

In 376, the Visigoths, fleeing before the Ostrogoths, who in turn were fleeing before the Huns, were allowed to cross the Danube river and settle in the Balkans by the government of the Eastern Roman Empire. Mistreatment of the Gothic refugees caused a full-scale rebellion, and in 378 they inflicted a crippling defeat on the Eastern Roman field army in the Battle of Adrianople, in which Emperor Valens (364–378) was also killed. The defeat at Adrianople was shocking to the Romans, and forced them to negotiate with and settle the Visigoths within the borders of the Empire, where they would become semi-independent foederati under their own leader. Roman civil wars in the late 4th century, as well as periods of cold war between the imperial courts of the Western and Eastern Roman empires allowed the Visigoths under their leader Alaric I (395–410) to become an active force in imperial politics, only tenuously linked to the imperial government itself. The arrival of the Visigoths in the Balkans was followed by the Alans, Vandals and Suebi migrating into Gaul between 405 and 407 in the crossing of the Rhine. Though the barbarians on the Rhine were effectively kept in check and managed by the usurper-emperor Constantine III (407–411), the end of his reign due to further internal Roman conflict led to the tribes being able to penetrate deep into Gaul and Hispania.

With the barbarians settling within the imperial borders in large numbers, the second stage in the formation of the barbarian kingdoms was imperial acceptance of the status quo. Though Romans did not see the existence of the barbarian realms as desirable, they began to be tolerated through the 420s and 430s. It was not the goal of either the Romans or the barbarians to found lasting territorial kingdoms in the sense of replacing the imperial government; their formation derived not from an interest by the barbarians in founding them but rather from failures in Roman governance and the failure to grant the barbarian rulers a place within the Roman imperial systems. The early barbarian kings were tolerated only on the terms of the empire. Early kingdoms, such as those of the Suebi and Vandals in Hispania, were relegated to the edges of less important provinces. In 418, Emperor Honorius (393–423) settled the Visigoths in Aquitania in southern Gaul, the beginning of the Visigothic Kingdom. The Romans envisioned the settlement as a provisional settlement of loyal clients of the imperial government, whose support could be relied on in internal struggles, and not a ceding of territory given that the imperial government was also envisioned as continuing in the granted lands. Though Roman generals in the time of Honorius had worked to curb the influence and power of the barbarian kings, the number of civil wars that followed Honorius's death made the status of the barbarians a secondary concern. Instead of suppressing the barbarian kings, emperors and usurpers in the 4th century viewed them as useful internal players.

The third stage was the imperial government of the Western Roman Empire recognizing that it could no longer effectively administer its territories. This led the empire to cede effective control of more lands to the barbarian kings, whose realms now formed a permanent part of the landscape, though this did not mean that the lands within the former imperial borders ceased to be part of the empire on a conceptual level. Treaties made with the Visigoths in 439 and the Vandals, who had conquered North Africa, in 442 effectively recognized the rulers of those peoples as territorial governors of parts of imperial territory, ceasing the pretension of active imperial administration. These treaties, though not seen as irrevocable, laid the foundations of true territorial kingdoms.

Almost nowhere in the west were the kings firmly linked to territorial kingdoms until the very late fifth century or even later. The fourth and final stage in the formation of the barbarian kingdoms was the barbarian kings, left to their own devices, slowly losing the habit of waiting for the empire to again function properly and instead starting to take on the roles of the former emperors, becoming proper territorial kings. This process was only possible through the acceptance of the barbarian rulers by local Roman aristocrats, who in many cases supported the barbarian kings as they saw the possibility of restored Western Roman central control as an increasingly futile prospect. The exact process in which the barbarian kings took on certain functions and prerogatives previously ascribed to the Roman emperors is not entirely clear but it was a highly drawn-out process. Alaric I, the generally recognised first king of the Visigoths, is only seen as a king retroactively; contemporary sources call him only dux or at times hegemon, and he did not rule a kingdom, but rather spent much of his career unsuccessfully trying to integrate himself into the Roman imperial system as a Roman military officer. The earliest Visigoth ruler to unambiguously call himself king, and to issue documents from something resembling an imperial chancery, was Alaric II (484–507), though contemporary writings allude to widespread acceptance and recognition of a Visigothic kingdom in Gaul by the 450s. The Visigoths did not establish a secure power-base as a consciously post-imperial kingdom until the 560s under Liuvigild, after slow and often brutal conquests in Hispania.

Roman heritage and continuity

Administrative continuity 
Although power was dispersed from a single capital, such as Rome or Ravenna, to local kings and warlords, the apparatus of the former Roman imperial government fundamentally continued to function in the west as the new barbarian rulers adopted many aspects of the late Roman administration. Roman law continued to remain the predominant legal system in the west through the fifth and sixth centuries. Several barbarian kings showing interest in legal matters and issuing their own law codes, developed based on Roman law. Initially, towns and cities, the main building blocks of the Roman Empire, remained the building blocks of the barbarian kingdoms as well. The old Roman imperial administrative framework dissolved and disappeared only gradually in a slow process spanning centuries, at times accelerated due to political upheaval. 

The major difference between the Roman imperial administration and the new royal administrations that meant to imitate and replicate it was their scale. Without a central imperial court, and officers that linked the governments of the different provinces together, the administration in the kingdoms was flattened. Compared to the Roman Empire, the governments of the barbarian kingdoms were as such significantly less deep and less complex. This breakdown in Roman order had the side effect of resulting in a marked decline in living standards, as well as a marked collapse in economic and social complexity.

Roman legitimacy 
In the aftermath of the collapse of the Western Roman Empire, the various barbarian rulers in Western Europe made an effort to strengthen legitimacy by adopting certain elements of the former empire. The title most widely used by the kings was rex, which formed a basis of authority that they could use in diplomacy with other kingdoms and the surviving imperial court in Constantinople. Although some Eastern Roman authors, such as Procopius, described rex as a 'barbarian term', it had at points in the past sometimes been used to describe Roman emperors and clearly indicated that the barbarian rulers were sovereign rulers, though not with authority eclipsing that of the emperor in Constantinople. Many, but not all, of the barbarian kings used ethnic qualifiers in their title, the Frankish kings for instance rendering their title as rex Francorum ("king of the Franks"). The rulers of Italy, where the pretense of Roman continuity was especially strong, are notable in that they only rarely used ethnic qualifiers.

In addition to rex, the barbarian rulers also assumed a selection of Roman imperial titles and honours. Virtually all of the barbarian kings assumed the style dominus noster ("our lord"), previously used only by Roman emperors, and nearly all of the Visigothic kings and the barbarian kings of Italy (up until the end of the Lombard kingdom) used the praenomen Flavius, borne by virtually all Roman emperors in late antiquity. The early barbarian rulers were careful to maintain a subordinate position to the emperors in Constantinople, and were in turn sometimes recognised with various honours by the emperors, in effect being highly autonomous client kings.

Possibility of imperial restoration 

In the early 6th century, the most powerful kings in Western Europe were Theodoric the Great of Italy and Clovis I of the Franks. Both rulers received honours and recognition by the imperial court in Constantinople, which granted them a certain degree of legitimacy and was used to justify territorial expansion. Theodoric was recognised as a patrician by Emperor Anastasius I, who also returned the western imperial regalia, in Constantinople since 476, to Italy. These regalia were worn by Theoderic on occasions, and some of his Roman subjects referred to him as an emperor, but he appears to himself only have used the title rex, careful not to insult the emperor. After the Franks defeated the Visigoths at the Battle of Vouillé in 507, Clovis was recognised by Anastasius as honorary consul, a patrician and a client king. Like Theoderic, some of the subjects of Clovis also referred to him as an emperor, rather than king, though he never adopted that title himself. If Theodoric and Clovis had gone to war against each other, something that appeared likely many times, it is conceivable that either would have re-established the Western Roman Empire under their own rule. Though no war happened, such developments worried the eastern emperors, who after seeing how their granted honours could be seen as imperial "stamps of approval" never granted them to the same extent again. Instead, the eastern empire began to emphasise its own exclusive Roman legitimacy, which it would continue to do for the rest of its history.

In the 6th century, Eastern Roman historians began to describe the west as "lost" to barbarian invasions, rather than the barbarian kings having been settled by the Romans themselves, a development termed the "Justinianic ideological offensive" by modern historians. Though the rise of the barbarian kingdoms in the place of the western empire was far from an entirely peaceful process, the idea of "barbarian invasions" bringing a sudden and violent end to the world of antiquity, once the widely accepted narrative among modern historians, does not satisfactorily describe the period. Ascribing the end of the Western Roman Empire to "barbarian invasions" ignores the diversity of the new kingdoms in favor of a homogenous non-Roman barbarism and ignores any analysis in which the empire could be seen as complicit in its own collapse.

Culture 

Despite being divided into several smaller realms, the populace of the barbarian kingdoms maintained strong cultural and religious connections with each other, and continued to speak Latin. The barbarian kings adopted both Christianity (at this point firmly established as the Roman religion) and the Latin language themselves, thus inheriting and maintaining Rome's cultural heritage. At the same time, they also remained connected to their non-Roman identity and made efforts to establish their own distinct identities. The Eastern Roman Empire emphasizing its own unique Roman legitimacy, sometimes through waging war on the barbarian kingdoms, and the barbarian ruling class and Roman population merging ethnically, led to the gradual disappearance of Roman identity in the west. The fading connectivity to the Roman Empire and the political division of the west led to a gradual fragmentation of culture and language, eventually giving rise to the modern Romance peoples and Romance languages.

End of the barbarian kingdoms 

The barbarian kingdoms proved to be extremely fragile states. Even out of the most powerful and longest-lasting kingdoms, those of the Visigoths, Franks and Lombards, only that of the Franks survived the Early Middle Ages. The Visigothic realm collapsed already in the sixth century and had to be restored almost from scratch under Liuvigild in the 560s and 570s. It was finally destroyed when it was conquered by the Umayyad Caliphate in the early 8th century. In a series of wars in the 6th century, the Eastern Roman Empire under Justinian I (527–565) conquered and destroyed the kingdoms of the Vandals in Africa and that of the Ostrogoths in Italy. Most of the smaller kingdoms in Gaul were conquered and absorbed into the Frankish kingdom or disappear from historical sources entirely. 

The new realms that emerged in the seventh through ninth centuries represented a new order largely disconnected from the old Roman world. The Umayyad Caliphate, which conquered Hispania from the Visigoths and North Africa from the Eastern Romans, made no pretences of Roman continuity. The Lombard kingdom, though often counted among the other barbarian kingdoms, ruled an Italy destroyed by conflict between the Ostrogoths and the Eastern Roman Empire. Their rule in Italy came to an end when their kingdom was conquered by the Franks in 774. The small successor kingdoms of the Visigoths in Hispania, the predecessors of medieval kingdoms such as León, Castile and Aragon, were fundamentally sub-Frankish, culturally and administratively closer to the Frankish kingdom than the fallen Visigothic realm.

As the sole survivor of the old kingdoms, the Frankish realm provided the model of early medieval kingship that would later inspire medieval monarchs throughout the rest of the medieval period. Though the Frankish rulers remembered Roman ideals and often aspired to vague ideas of imperial restoration, the centuries of their rule had transformed the governance of their kingdom into something that resembled the Roman Empire very little. The new form of government was a personal one, based on powers of and relationships between individuals, rather than the heavily administrated, judicial and bureaucratic system of the Roman Empire. The time of the barbarian kingdoms came to an end with the coronation of Charlemagne, king of the Franks, as Roman emperor by Pope Leo III in 800, in opposition to the authority of the remaining Eastern Roman Empire. Charlemagne's Carolingian Empire, a predecessor of France and Germany, was in reality more similar to a collection of kingdoms united only by Charlemagne's authority than a realm with a meaningful connection to the old Western Roman Empire.

See also 

Early Middle Ages
Byzantine Empire under the Justinian dynasty
History of Europe
Migration Period
Dark Ages (historiography)
Core Europe
Germanic Europe
Latin Church
Late antiquity
Germanic Christianity
Germanic Heroic Age
Timeline of Germanic kingdoms in the Iberian Peninsula

Notes

References

Bibliography 

 
 
 

 
 
 

 
 
 

States and territories established in the 400s
States and territories disestablished in the 8th century
6th century in Europe
7th century in Europe
  
Former kingdoms
Migration Period
Barbarians